Deylam County is in Bushehr province, Iran. The capital of the county is the city of Bandar Deylam. At the 2006 census, the county's population was 29,079 in 6,362 households. The following census in 2011 counted 31,570 people in 7,847 households. At the 2016 census, the county's population was 34,828 in 9,856 households.

Administrative divisions

The population history of Deylam County's administrative divisions over three consecutive censuses is shown in the following table. The latest census shows two districts, four rural districts, and two cities.

References

 

Counties of Bushehr Province